The Abbot of Burton was the head of Burton Abbey, the Benedictine monastery of St Mary and St Modwenna at Burton-upon-Trent in Staffordshire, England. Allegedly the church was begun by a wandering Irish holy woman, but it was actually founded c. 1003 as a Benedictine abbey by Wulfric Spott. A continuous series of abbots, which slight possible interruptions, can be traced thereafter until the English Reformation.

List of abbots

Notes

References
 
 
 

 *
Burton
Abbot of Burton